Dineura is a genus of sawflies belonging to the family Tenthredinidae.

The species of this genus are found in Europe, Easternmost Asia and Northern America.

Species:
 Dineura cockerelli Rohwer, 1908
 Dineura fuscipennis Rohwer, 1908

References

Tenthredinidae
Sawfly genera